The provinces of Brazil were the primary subdivisions of the country during the period of the Empire of Brazil (1822 - 1889).

On February 28, 1821, the provinces were established in the Kingdom of Brazil (then part of the United Kingdom of Portugal, Brazil and the Algarves), superseding the captaincies that were in place at the time.

Provinces of 1821

Changes from 1821-1889

1821
The captaincies of Brazil are renamed provinces.

The present-day Uruguay is occupied by the Portuguese Army and incorporated in Brazil as its Cisplatine Province.

1822
Independence of Brazil, with the provinces becoming provinces of the Empire of Brazil.

1823
The last Brazilian provinces that remained loyal to the Portuguese Government in Lisbon adhere to the Empire of Brazil.

1828
Cisplatina Province became the independent state of Uruguay.

1834
The city of Rio de Janeiro, the imperial capital, was removed from the Province of Rio de Janeiro, and was included in the Neutral Municipality. At the same time, the capital of the Province of Rio de Janeiro was transferred to Niterói.

1850
Grão-Pará Province split into Amazonas Province and Pará Province.

1889
In 1889 the Empire of Brazil became the Republic of the United States of Brazil and the provinces became states. The Neutral Municipality that included the city of Rio de Janeiro l became the Federal District.

See also
States of Brazil
Captaincies of Brazil

References

 
Brazil geography-related lists
Brazil history-related lists